Frederick Rollin Feitshans III (born 17 January 1937), known as Buzz Feitshans, is an American film producer best known for his work in the action field and his collaborations with John Milius and Carolco Pictures.

Biography
Feitshans graduated from the University of Southern California in 1962 with a degree in education, then went to work for the American Broadcasting Company as a film editor. In 1964, he joined American International Pictures as an editor and became head of the editorial department for ten years.

In 1973, Feitshans made his debut as a producer with Dillinger, a film written and directed by John Milius. Milius and Feitshans formed A-Team Productions that same year and produced Big Wednesday (1978), 1941 (1979) and Hardcore (1979). A-Team Productions dissolved, but Feitshans continued to act as Milius' producer on Conan the Barbarian (1982), Uncommon Valor (1983), and Red Dawn (1984).

Feitshans produced First Blood in 1982, and also its first two sequels. The films were made by executive producers Mario Kassar and Andrew Vajna of Carolco Pictures, whom Feitshans frequently worked with. In 1988, he became executive vice president of production and a member of the board of directors for Carolco Pictures.

Feitshans joined Cinergi Productions in 1992, serving as executive producer for Medicine Man (1992), Tombstone (1993), Renaissance Man (1994), Color of Night (1994), Die Hard with a Vengeance (1995), Judge Dredd (1995), The Scarlet Letter (1995), Nixon (1995), Evita (1996), Shadow Conspiracy (1997), and An Alan Smithee Film: Burn Hollywood Burn (1997).

He retired from film production in 1997.

Personal life
Feitshans is the son of Lotus Grant Feitshans (1909–2007) and film editor Fred R. Feitshans Jr. (1909–1987). 

He is the grandson of Sennett Bathing Beauty Ora Carew and Harry E. Grant on his mother's side and tennis player Frederick Rollin Feitshans and Celia Traber Feitshans on his father's. 

He married Charlotte Wells (divorced 1978) and Raffaella De Laurentiis.

He is the father of four, including cinematographer Fred "Buzz" Feitshans IV (born 1959).

Select credits
He was a producer in all films unless otherwise noted.

Film

As cinematographer

Camera and electrical department

Editorial department

Miscellaneous crew

As editor

Unmade projects
Amanda (1996)
Broadway Brawler
Crusade
Smoke and Mirrors

Television

As cinematographer

Camera and electrical department

References

External links

Buzz Feitshans Papers at Margaret Herrick Library

1937 births
Living people
Film producers from California
USC Rossier School of Education alumni
People from Los Angeles